Lugnagullagh is a townland in County Westmeath, Ireland.

Lugnagullagh is one of 11 townlands of the civil parish of Tyfarnham in the barony of Corkaree in the Province of Leinster.

The neighbouring townlands are: Scurlockstown to the north and east, Ballard to the south–east, Ballyboy  to the south, Slane Beg to the west and Johnstown to the north–west.

In the 1911 census of Ireland there were 2 houses and 6 inhabitants in the townland.

References

External links
Map of Lugnagullagh at openstreetmap.org
Lugnagullagh at the IreAtlas Townland Data Base
Lugnagullagh at Townlands.ie
Lugnagullagh at The Placenames Database of Ireland

Townlands of County Westmeath